Siegenthaler-Kaestner Esker is a  state nature preserve located in Champaign County, Ohio, United States. It contains an esker, kame, and kettle, all glacial landforms.

External links 
 Siegenthaler-Kaestner Esker State Nature Preserve Official Website

Protected areas of Champaign County, Ohio
Ohio State Nature Preserves